Melanocera is a genus of moths in the family Saturniidae first described by Léon Sonthonnax in 1901.

Species
Melanocera dargei Terral, 1991
Melanocera menippe (Westwood, 1849)
Melanocera nereis (Rothschild, 1898)
Melanocera parva Rothschild, 1907
Melanocera pinheyi Lemaire & Rougeot, 1974
Melanocera pujoli Lemaire & Rougeot, 1974
Melanocera sufferti (Weymer, 1896)
Melanocera widenti Terral & Darge, 1991

References

Saturniinae